Chinnathurai is a small village in Kanyakumari district of Tamil Nadu, at the southern tip of peninsular India. The  two major towns nearby are Thiruvananthapuram in Kerala state to the west and Nagercoil to the east. The town is located on the coast and is historically a fishing village, specializing in catching sharks and other large fishes.

History
Chinnathurai was officially formed in 1979. Earlier, it was a part of Thoothoor, which was a collection of three villages; Thoothoor, Chinnathurai and Eraviputhenthurai, and had the same church administration. As the population started increasing, Chinnathurai and other nearby areas became separate villages. Because these villages were near to river or sea, they were referred to as "thurai" in Tamil, which means "a place where people can approach the shore and load and unload from the boats". Thoothoor is on the shore of the Arabian Sea and a fishing village that served as a small port in the Kingdom of Travancore. The people were trained in warfare and the king used them to guard the sea shore after Chinnathurai was formed. The plan for the church was drawn immediately after the partition, because the church is the centre of administration of the Christian villages. St. Jude, the Apostle and relative to Jesus Christ, was made patron saint for Chinnathurai Parish. The church in Chinnathurai was inaugurated in 1990. The village was self-contained and its structures are built by the village people with their own money.

Geography and climate

Chinnathurai is on the western coast of Tamil Nadu. The Kerala border from the village is approximately 8 km. It is about 18 km from Marthanadam and 10 km south to Kaliyakkavilai (both are prominent business towns in the area). It is well connected to other near towns through roadways. The Arabian Sea is on the shores of Chinnathurai's south. Nithiravilai, a small business town. Eraviputhanthurai and Thoothoor, both fishing villages, are fortifying their west and east boundaries respectively. The village is spread across approximately 1,000 acres.

Chinnathurai is a Catholic Christian village but also has some Hindu families, diversified like India. The area of the village is approximately 2 km2. The village has a large Catholic churcH that can accommodate approximately 1,000 people. It has five small Christian shrines of different saints on its various parts. 

There are four schools and one college inside the village and two schools outside the village. St. Jude's Community Hall serves as common hall. St. Jude's Sports Club is maintaining a library. A small post office and a petrol pump which is owned by the Government also cater the respective needs.

Climate
The village has a tropical climate and therefore does not experience distinct seasons. The mean maximum temperature is 34 °C and the mean minimum temperature is 21 °C. The humidity is high and rises to about 90% during the monsoon season.

Demographics

Education

Chinnathurai  has a high rate of literacy. According to 2017 survey, the village has 99.5% literacy rate. The average male literacy rate is 99% and Female is 100%. Christian Missionaries are responsible for uplifting education here. St. Jude's College plays a vital role in Higher education. Most of the people were well educated and they were working in many multinational corporations and also in several foreign countries.

Sports

The people in this village are incomparable in sports. The players are representing for various universities, districts, states and national levels. They are represented in India's most prestigious football tournaments like Santosh Trophy, National Games of India, etc. for Tamil Nadu state.

Apart from that, the players are playing India's leading sports clubs likes ICF-Chennai, Chennai Nethaji Club, Chennai Customs, Indian Bank, Madras Sporting Union, Indian Army, various universities, etc. Every year the St. Jude's Club of Chinnathurai used to conduct football tournament for encouraging upcoming players. Our players were playing in leading clubs.

People

Chinnathurai as a village is on the shore of the Arabian Sea. The people live in this village are fisherman who venture into the deep sea to earn their daily livelihood. The fisher folks of this village use the innovative methods of fishing and uses modern devices like GPS, Echo sounder etc. even though they are not much educated. They travel by sea till all the borders of India for fishing. Using small mechanized boats, they stay on the sea for more than a month for fishing. Although the village is known as Christian village, some Hindu families are also live in the village. Everybody in this village, be its Christian or be it Hindu, are living in harmony.

Religion

It is believed that in 1558 St. Francis Xavier baptised these people. That was the start of Christians.

In 1978, Chinnathurai was separated from Thoothoor and was officially formed as a parish under the Thiruvananthapuram Diocese. The foundation of the church was laid in 1963 and was completed in 1988. The church is located in middle of the parish and is surrounded with white sand. The Patron Saint for the Chinnathurai Church is St. Jude, the relative and one of the Apostles of Jesus Christ. The feast of St. Jude falls on 28 October on every year and is celebrated in Chinnathurai.

Shrines

In Chinnathurai you can see a lot of Shrines of different Saints in different locations. In the early years most of locations were empty and in some locations the people started to live small groups. Since there is no big Church when St. Francis Xavier baptised the people in this region, he installed big Crosses made in stone in all locations where the people lived in groups for their worship. Later the people in that region constructed Shrines in the name of different Saints. In some shrines about 15 years before only the Crosses were removed and was reconstructed. This is how the shines in Tamil got the name of 'Kurusady', which means 'below the Cross'.

In Chinnathurai you can witness about 5 shrines right now. The first Shrine we are going to see is the Grotto of Our Lady of Lourd which is in the middle of the parish and near by the Church. This is believed to be that the Grotto was constructed in the year 1940. The Grotto adds beauty to the Parish along with the Church with the surroundings of white sand. There are many accounts that a lot of miracles happened in this Grotto.

The second one is St. Antony's Shrine and St Sebastian's Shrine both are on the shores of Arabian Sea. St. Nicolas' Shrine is located in the western part of Chinnathurai which was earlier on the shore of Arabian Sea. The St. Anne's Shrine is located a bit inside the village surrounded by the houses. All these Shrines are believed to more than a Century old. Keeping the tradition on, the people in the surroundings of each Shrine come together and celebrate the feast of the Saints on respective feasts.

References

https://cdn.s3waas.gov.in/s38fe0093bb30d6f8c31474bd0764e6ac0/uploads/2018/04/2018040615.pdf
http://chinnathurai.webs.com/
https://web.archive.org/web/20091201181014/http://www.chinnathurai.net/

Villages in Kanyakumari district